Parrs Wood High School is a coeducational secondary school in East Didsbury, Manchester, England, located off Wilmslow Road behind Parrs Wood Entertainment Complex. It educates pupils from the age of 11 to 18 years. A-Levels are taught at the Parrs Wood Sixth Form Centre, which is integrated with the main school.

History
Parrs Wood was the 4th largest school in the UK in 2008, with 2,030 students and 450 in the sixth form centre.

In 2015, the governors of Parrs Wood decided to embark on the process of turning the school into an academy, despite opposition from staff and local politicians.

It converted in 2016, the former school had community school status; its URN was 105556.

After the Manchester Arena bombing, the school's choir recorded the title track from Ariana Grande's My Everything to benefit the victims. The choir then performed the song at the One Love Manchester concert with Ariana Grande herself to further honour and aid the victims.

The building
The original school building, built in 1967, was demolished in 2000 and was rebuilt from scratch on a site behind the original school; the contractors built the school building in exchange for a portion of the school grounds on which to build an entertainment complex.

Sixth form
Parrs Wood Sixth Form Centre is part of the school campus. It opened in 2000 after the rebuilding of the main school. The centre is located in a Grade II listed building independent from the main school.

Ofsted 
In 2007, an Ofsted inspection showed the school to be lacking in several areas, particularly in KS3 SAT results, and criticised the school management for failure to act to remedy the situation. The report reflected that this situation was unacceptable and the school was placed in special measures. In February 2010, OFSTED judged the school to be satisfactory and as such no longer required special measures.

In its most recent inspection, the school was graded as Grade 2 - Good.

Controversy 
In May 2007, a canister of CS gas was discharged in the science area of Parrs Wood, which resulted in 58 students and staff being taken to hospital. The incident was described by Greater Manchester Police as an "idiotic prank".

In 2012, Judge Peeling QC, found against the governing body of the school in a Judicial Review of a decision to suspend one of the governors.

The school is directly opposite a branch of Grosvenor G Casinos in the Parrs Wood entertainment centre complex. Members of Manchester City Council's planning committee originally rejected the plans to build the casino after Didsbury residents objected due to a possible negative effect on the livelihood of pupils at the school: students would have to walk past the casino on a daily basis in order to attend. Despite the original rejection, Grosvenor G Casinos were granted planning permission in March 2011. The Parrs Wood branch has been open as of June 2012.

In January 2023, a 14-year-old girl suffered serious, though not life-threatening, injuries after being stabbed by a fellow student using a 'sharp instrument'. The perpetrator was arrested by police.

Notable former pupils
Matt Crampton, cyclist
Holliday Grainger, English screen and stage actress
Lisa Nandy, Labour MP
Hannah Pool, fashion writer
Lucy Powell,  Labour MP
Nick Speak, cricketer

Pictures

References

External links 
 
 The school's choir sings the title track from My Everything (2017)

Educational institutions established in 1967
Secondary schools in Manchester
Didsbury
1967 establishments in England
Academies in Manchester